Iryna Valentynivna Venediktova (born 21 September 1978) is a Ukrainian politician, academic, and lawyer, previously a prosecutor general of Ukraine from March 2020 to July 2022. She was the first woman to hold the office and was suspended on 17 July 2022 by Ukrainian President Volodymyr Zelenskyy. On 19 July, Venediktova was dismissed following a vote in the Verkhovna Rada, which was tabled by Zelenskyy, and pointing to the presence of personnel collaborating with occupying Russian forces within her agency.

Biography 
Venediktova was born on 21 September 1978 in Kharkiv (Ukrainian SSR) in a family of lawyers. Her mother, Valentyna Mykhailivna Venediktova, was a candidate of juridical science and worked at both Yaroslav Mudryi National Law University and Kharkiv National University of Internal Affairs. She did research and taught at the same time.

In 2000, Venediktova graduated with honours from Kharkiv National University of Internal Affairs Faculty of Management and Computer Science, majoring in Law and Management.

From 2000 to 2004, Venediktova was a lecturer at the Department of Jurisprudence at the Kharkiv Humanitarian Institute of the People's Ukrainian Academy. In 2003, at Yaroslav Mudryi National Law Academy she passed her candidate's thesis defence on the subject "Agreement on trust management of property as a form of implementation of the legal institution of trust management of property in Ukraine", receiving the degree of Candidate of Juridical Science.

In 2004, she was the associate professor of the Department of Justice at V.N. Karazin Kharkiv National University.

From 2005 to 2019, she was the head of the Department of Civil Law at V.N. Karazin Kharkiv National University. While she was a professor at Karazin Kharkiv National University, she was also the faculty advisor for the Leavitt Institute for International Development's program on adversarial proceedings, which ran for a year-long semester.

In 2013, at Taras Shevchenko National University of Kyiv, she passed her doctoral thesis defence on the subject "Protection of interests guaranteed by law in civil law".

In 2014, she received the academic rank of professor at the Department of Civil Law at V.N. Karazin Kharkiv National University.

Until 2019, she was a member of the editorial boards of specialized scientific publications and specialized academic councils: deputy head of the editorial board of a specialized publication "Bulletin of V.N. Karazin Kharkiv National University". Series "Law", "Medical Law", and "Private Law". She was the chairman of specialized academic councils at V.N. Karazin Kharkiv National University. She provided training for doctors of philosophy, assisting in passing the defence of one doctor and ten candidates' law theses.

She is the author of more than 100 scientific and scientific-methodical works published in national and foreign publications, among them 8 monographs, 80 scientific, and 4 scientific-methodical publications.

Political activity 
In 2018, Venediktova became a legal adviser to Volodymyr Zelensky. She was a member of the campaign headquarters of the candidate for President of Ukraine Zelensky as an expert on judicial reform.

In the July 2019 Ukrainian parliamentary election, she was elected as an MP of the Verkhovna Rada (Ukraine's parliament) on the party-list of the pro-president political party "Servant of the People" (No. 3 on the party list).

On 29 August 2019, Venediktova took the chair of the Verkhovna Rada Committee on Legal Policy.

Prosecutor general 

On 17 March 2020, Iryna Venediktova was appointed as a prosecutor general. Her appointment was backed by 269 MPs. Venediktova began her work as the prosecutor general with joint coordination meetings with the government law enforcement agencies, where they discussed the problems of investigating corruption crimes, as well as damage compensation to the state. Venediktova took personalharge of high-profile criminal cases, such as those involving journalists and activists, that are in the public eyets. Durinherhe first 100 days in power, Iryna Venediktova held 24 meetings at the Prosecutor General's Office with representatives of the competent authorities of foreign states and international organizations, during which the issue of continuing the reform of the prosecution authorities was discussed. On 4 June 2020 (for the first time in 10 years), Iryna Venediktova chaired the coordination meeting at the Prosecutor General's Office with the heads of law enforcement agencies on combating tortures caused by law enforcement officers, as well as inhumane and degrading behaviour and punishment.

On 16 September 2020, the National Anti-Corruption Bureau of Ukraine (NABU) accused Venediktova of manipulative language during her speech to the Ukrainian parliament the previous day. According to NABU there was enough evidence to start investigating Servant of the People MP Oleksandr Yurchenko for taking a bribe and that NABU had asked (this was denied by Venediktova) the Prosecutor General's Office to ask for the extradition of Oleg Bakhmatyuk from Austria. On 17 September 2020 Venediktova ordered the detention of Oleksandr Yurchenko, although the previous day she had claimed in parliament that there was insufficient grounds for signing an arrest warrant for Yurchenko.

2022 Russian invasion

During the 2022 phase of the Russian invasion of Ukraine, Venediktova played a major role in coordinating legal procedures and prosecutions for war crimes in the invasion. In late March 2022, she announced the creation of the Task Force on Accountability for Crimes Committed in Ukraine, an international legal task force that would support Ukrainian prosecutors in coordinating legal cases in multiple courts in several jurisdictions for war crimes related to the invasion. Venediktova stated that the Ukrainian prosecutors had collected 2,500 "possible war crimes cases", including the Mariupol theatre airstrike, and "several hundred suspects".

On 17 July 2022, Venediktova was suspended as prosecutor general by Volodymyr Zelenskyy.

Ambassador to Switzerland

In November 2022, Ukrainian president Volodymyr Zelensky signed a decree confirming his country’s selection of Iryna Venediktova as the new Ambassador to Switzerland.

References

External links 
 
 Verkhovna Rada  
 

1978 births
Living people
Politicians from Kharkiv
Academic staff of the National University of Kharkiv
Ukrainian women lawyers
21st-century Ukrainian lawyers
Ninth convocation members of the Verkhovna Rada
Servant of the People (political party) politicians
21st-century Ukrainian politicians
21st-century Ukrainian women politicians
General Prosecutors of Ukraine
National Security and Defense Council of Ukraine
Ukrainian people of Russian descent
21st-century women lawyers
Women members of the Verkhovna Rada